Kajil (also Romanized as Kajīl) is a village in Khara Rud Rural District, in the Central District of Siahkal County, Gilan Province, Iran. At the 2006 census, its population was 384, in 111 families.

References 

Populated places in Siahkal County